John Andrew Todd FMedSci FRS (born 23 June 1958) is Professor of Precision Medicine at the University of Oxford, director of the Wellcome Center for Human Genetics and the JDRF/Wellcome Trust Diabetes and Inflammation Laboratory, in addition to Jeffrey Cheah Fellow in Medicine at Brasenose College. He works in collaboration with David Clayton and Linda Wicker to examine the molecular basis of type 1 diabetes.

Early life and education 
Todd was born on 23 June 1958. He received a Bachelor of Science (BSc) degree in biological sciences from the University of Edinburgh in 1980. He went on to study biochemistry at the University of Cambridge, where he was supervised by David Ellar, completing his Doctor of Philosophy (PhD) degree in 1983 with a thesis entitled "Penicillin-binding proteins during growth and differentiation of bacilli".

Awards and honors 

 Founding Fellow of the Academy of Medical Sciences (1998).
 Honorary Member of the Royal College of Physicians (2000).
 Fellow of the Royal Society in (2009).
 JDRF David Rumbrough Award for Scientific Excellence (2011).
 Helmholtz international fellow award (2015).
 Emeritus Senior Investigator at the National Institute for Health and Care Research (NIHR) (2018).

References

External links
 JDRF/WT Diabetes and Inflammation Laboratory
 Cambridge BioResource 
 Profile at the Cambridge Institute for Medical Research

Living people
Scottish geneticists
Fellows of the Royal Society
Place of birth missing (living people)
Date of birth missing (living people)
Fellows of Brasenose College, Oxford
Alumni of the University of Edinburgh
1958 births
Minkowski Prize recipients
NIHR Senior Investigators